The meetuupaki (mee tuu paki: dance standing [with] paddles) is an ancient Tongan group dance, already reported by early European navigators like captain Cook. This dance has been traditionally designed for men although women may take part if there are not enough men. The mee tuu paki resembles a kind of war dance; albeit, it is done with little symbolic paddles as opposed to arms.

Dress
The dress for this dance invariably is a large sheet of ngatu wrapped around the body from chest to ankles. A girdle of leaves around the waist (sisi) is often added.

Movements
The movements are largely with the paddles in the hand, but the proper addition of the small and subtle movements with the head and legs make the difference between a good and poor performance. The paddles are not used for row like gestures, but are rotated around, moved to left and right or up and down. The dancers start in one row, maybe two if there are many, but from time to time split up the rows in what seems chaotic movements, yet at the end they come back again in perfect unison.

Music
It is usually the dance master who operates a little slit drum (lali) to keep the beat, while the dancers themselves sing the song, possibly with assistance of others. The beat is always slow in the beginning, but goes faster and faster when the end approaches to excite the dancers and the public.

History
The words of the songs are in a largely unintelligible language, although some sailor terms can be distinguished. As there is also a version of the meetuupaki in Futuna, called tapaki even though different, a link in that direction seems to be most likely. The theory is that the meetuupaki was composed somewhere in the 12th to 16th century by an internationally oriented poet on Uvea to honour the Tui Tonga empire. When the Tui Tonga Kauʻulufonua I (Kauulufenua-fekai, K. the wild, in Futunan) had lost some decisive battles, which heralded the end of the empire and of the political function of the Tui Tonga, he was forced to give meetuupaki to Futuna, where the parts are still guarded as secrets. In addition the Futunans declared that from now on the Tui Tonga title should be inferior to any Futunan title, and if ever a Tongan boat would make it to their island, it would be destroyed and offered to the gods. (This still happened in the 19th century as recorded by William Mariner (writer). A Tongan proverb: vete fakafutuna (take apart in the Futunan way), still refers to something to be dismantled completely.

There is also a theory that the meetuupaki was a kind of Tongan passport of olden times. When a boat from Tonga arrived on one of the conquered islands the crew was invited to show their typical dance to prove that they came from Tonga and not from somewhere else. As they then still had their paddles in their hand, using them in a dance seem quite straight forward.

Verses
Verse 1
Kolulu e, Kolulu e
Kolulu e, sua mai mate
Fakapo, sua mai. Tu
E Fakapo, sua mai. Tu

Verse 2 
'O Latu, Latu e
Pe 'i Tonga mu'a kae tokelau.
'Ia, 'i'i'a, 'i'i'a.
Kaleki pala pui le vaha,
Kae liua manu ole vaha,
Kae ta ko ia si'ene nga'uta.
'Ia, 'i'i'a, 'i'i'a. Tu

Verse 3
'O Taputea taputea mai
He uia mala mai letai
'O Taputea taputea mai
He uia mala mai letai.
'o sulu'ia laupeanga tuia,
E uia mala maile uia. Tu

Verse 4
Lakuta e, Lakuta e
Lakuta sikipoi e, sikipoi e, sikipoi e
Lakuta e, Lakuta e 
Lakuta sikipoi e, sikipoi e,sikipoi e
Si ki 'olunga matau foe,
Ma'u e tata malie. Sikipoi e, sikipoi e. Tu

Verse 5
'O anu mai, fai mai
Tapu la e maile tai.
'E velo 'i sila, talava e
Vaka e sua, kite fonua.
Tafoe mai fe a fulisia lanumea
'E Tafea ki 'Uvea 'akatu.
Tonu mo tekau ki tu'a hakau
Fakahakea ki ai te vaka
Ko Tapunasili mo Longotevai
Fakangalo nai a e
Fakatakutaku he ta ko Tonga pasipasi mai
Fetuna ka toa e, 'io e

Verse 6
'O ngalutai ngalutai, 'o ngalutai ngalutai
'Utufia tefua te langi mana tefua fekai
Faka'oseia feliuekina holo e kina.
Kuo lava matautulia ia' taumalakia, 'isa ke
Pule mei vaka, 'ia.
Pule mei vaka kae tapa mai ama
Kae au mai kava kae ma'u te tangata
Kae to taulata, se ue i, se ue a.
Hifo le ala hakea le ala kae tau longolongo
Fakapuepue fano to mui tao, 'isa ke
'O ngalutai ngalu 'isa ke.

References

Futunan versions
D. Frimigacci; Aux temps de la terre noire; 1990; 
Tongan versions
O. Māhina; Tongan proverbs; 2004; 

Tongan culture
Dances of Tonga